Hystrix is a genus of diatom.

References

Brachysiraceae
Diatom genera